Sancha of Aragon was an illegitimate daughter of King Alfonso of Naples.

Sancha of Aragon may also refer to:

Sancha of Aragon (died 1097), daughter of King Ramiro I
Sancha of Aragon, Countess of Toulouse